Polygala sinisica is a species of plant in the family Polygalaceae. It is endemic to Italy.

Distribution
Polygala sinisica occurs only in Sardinia, along the coast at Capo Mannu, situated just north of Tharros in the Sinis region.

Its natural habitats are in Mediterranean shrubby vegetation and rocky areas.

It is an IUCN Red List Critically Endangered plant species and IUCN Top 50 Campaign Mediterranean Island Plants, threatened by habitat loss.

References

External links

IUCN - Top 50 Mediterranean Island Plants:Polygala sinisica

sinisica
Flora of Sardinia
Endemic flora of Italy
Critically endangered plants
Taxonomy articles created by Polbot